Leandro Fleitas (born 29 December 1983 in Moreno) is an Argentine football defender currently playing for Club Atlético Douglas Haig.

Fleitas started his playing career with Argentinos in 2003, he joined Olimpo de Bahía Blanca for a successful spell for the 2006–2007 season, helping the club to win both the Apertura and Clausura tournaments to gain automatic promotion to the Argentine Primera.

Told that he was not going to be considered by new coach Claudio Vivas for the Clausura 2009 Tournament, Fleitas decided to move on loan to Alianza Lima.

Titles

External links
 
 Argentine Primera statistics 

1983 births
Living people
Sportspeople from Buenos Aires Province
Argentine footballers
Association football defenders
Argentinos Juniors footballers
Olimpo footballers
Club Alianza Lima footballers
Juan Aurich footballers
Argentine Primera División players
Peruvian Primera División players
Argentine expatriate footballers
Expatriate footballers in Peru